Godfrey Ellis (born April 3, 1982 in Nassau, Bahamas) is a former Canadian football guard for the Calgary Stampeders of the Canadian Football League. He was drafted in the second round with the tenth overall pick in the 2005 CFL Draft by the Calgary Stampeders. He played CIS Football with Acadia University.

External links
Calgary Stampeders bio

1982 births
Living people
Calgary Stampeders players
Canadian football offensive linemen
Sportspeople from Nassau, Bahamas